Thomas Jackson Tindall (12 May 1891–1971) was an English footballer who played in the Football League for Accrington Stanley and Barnsley.

References

1891 births
1971 deaths
English footballers
Association football defenders
English Football League players
Barnsley F.C. players
Accrington Stanley F.C. (1891) players
Shirebrook Miners Welfare F.C. players